Jean-Antoine-Gabriel Davioud (30 October 1824 – 6 April 1881) was a French architect. He worked closely with Baron Haussmann on the transformation of Paris under Napoleon III during the Second Empire. Davioud is remembered for his contributions to architecture (e.g. the two theaters on the place du Châtelet and the city hall of the 19th arrondissement), parks (e.g. the Pré Catelan garden and the square des Batignolles) and urban amenities (fountains, pavilions, benches and kiosks).  These contributions now form an integral part of the style of Haussmann's Paris.

Biography

Davioud was born in Paris and studied at the École des Beaux-Arts under Léon Vaudoyer. He won the prestigious Second Grand Prix de Rome. In 1843, he began working in the planning department of the municipal government of Paris. First, he served as an assistant inspector and later was promoted to inspector general for architectural works. In 1855, he became  chief architect for the city’s parks and public spaces, where he worked with Adolphe Alphand (e.g. on the Bois de Boulogne and the Bois de Vincennes).

In November 1851, Davioud was asked to execute drawings of the façades of 80 of the 250 buildings that were to be demolished under Haussmann’s plans to extend the rue de Rivoli in central Paris. The demolitions were to begin in early 1852. This left only 60 days for Davioud to complete his drawings, which were to be colorized using his notes. He completed the task, but many of these drawings were destroyed when the Hôtel de Ville (the town hall) was burned down in 1871 during the Paris Commune. The surviving drawings now form part of the archive of documentation of what Paris looked like before the Haussmannian transformation during the Second Empire.

Davioud spent his entire career in the planning department of Paris.  He was a key member of the team that radically altered the city’s layout and look. As a close associate of the urban planner Baron Haussmann, he designed much of the characteristic Parisian street furniture (benches, pavilions, bandstands, fountains, lampposts, signposts, fences, balustrades and jetties) as well as a number of landmark buildings. His work is noted for its ornamental quality and for its exotic references (e.g. the Moorish influences seen in the Palais du Trocadero). Among his most notable projects are the popular Saint-Michel Fountain in Place Saint-Michel, the old Palais du Trocadéro (built for thé 1878 World Fair, demolished in 1937), the town hall of the nineteenth arrondissement and the two theatres at the Place du Châtelet (the Théâtre du Châtelet and the Théâtre de la Ville.)

In 1868, Davioud succeeded Jacques Landry as mayor of Houlgate, where he stayed until 1871. His mandate was interrupted when he was appointed capitaine du génie during the Franco-Prussian War. Noted for his work in Paris, he built a single villa in Houlgate, La Brise, on the Route de Caumont.

Davioud died in 1881. In 1918, his family donated 600 of his drawings to the General Inspectorate of Technical Services for Architecture. The drawings were subsequently split between the Hôtel de Ville and the pavillon de Bagatelle.  Their re-discovery in 1981 by the Library of the Hôtel de Ville helped to reveal Davioud’s major contributions to the city of Paris and rekindled interest in his work.

Selected works 

 Le Panorama National, now the Théâtre du Rond-Point, created for the Universal Exposition of 1855
 Fontaine Saint-Michel, in the Place Saint-Michel, with sculptor Henri Alfred Jacquemart, 1860
 Two theatres at the Place du Châtelet (Théâtre du Châtelet and Théâtre de la Ville), 1860–1862
 Temple de la Sybille on the Île du Belvédère, Parc des Buttes-Chaumont, in the 19th arrondissement, 1869
 Fontaine de l'Observatoire and the Avenue de l'Observatoire (with sculptor Jean-Baptiste Carpeaux and others), 1873
 The Mairie, the municipal building in the 19th arrondissement, 1876–1878
 The former Palais du Trocadéro, built for the Universal Exposition of 1878
 Magasins-Réunis, in the Place de la République
 Jardin des Champs-Élysées
 Wrought-iron grillwork for the entry gate of the Parc Monceau, Davioud’s ornate gateway and the metal barrier accounted for half of the expense of re-designing the Parc.
 Fontaine du Château d'eau, Place Daumesnil, 12th arrondissement
 Entry pavilions for the Bois de Boulogne, 16th arrondissement
 Square des Batignolles, 17th arrondissement

Gallery

See also
 Napoleon III style
 Fountains in Paris
 History of parks and gardens of Paris

References 

 Adolf K. Placzek, Macmillan Encyclopedia of Architects, Collier Macmillan, 1982, page 504.
 Structurae entry
 

Architects
1824 births
1881 deaths
Davioud
19th-century French architects
Mayors of places in Normandy
People from Calvados (department)
Prix de Rome for architecture
École des Beaux-Arts alumni
Burials at Montparnasse Cemetery